Polymyxa graminis is a species of plasmodiophorid cercozoans. It is an obligate parasite of plant roots and, though itself non-pathogenic, is responsible for the transmission of several very important plant viruses, including barley yellow mosaic virus (BaYMV) and soil-borne wheat mosaic virus (SBWMV).

References 

 Plasmodiophorid Home Page
 Konstantin Kanyuka, Elaine Ward and Michael J. Adams. Polymyxa graminis and the cereal viruses it transmits: a research challenge. Molecular Plant Pathology, Vol 4 page 393.

Endomyxa
Plant pathogens and diseases by vector